Della by Starlight is the seventh album by singer Della Reese, and her second for RCA Victor. After her success at Jubilee Records, and a million-seller hit with "And That Reminds Me", she switched to RCA, where she would go on to have her biggest hits "Don't You Know?" (Billboard Hot 100 #2) and "Not One Minute More" (Billboard Hot 100 #16).

The album's title is a play on the song "Stella by Starlight", which does not appear on the album.

Track listing

 "The Touch of Your Lips"
 "He Was Too Good to Me"
 "That Old Feeling"
 "I Had the Craziest Dream"
 "I Wish I Knew"
 "Lamplight"
 "How Did He Look?"
 "More Than You Know"
 "These Foolish Things"
 "Deep in a Dream"
 "Embraceable You"
 "Two Sleepy People"

References

Della Reese albums
1960 albums
Big band albums
RCA Victor albums
Albums produced by Hugo & Luigi
Albums arranged by Glenn Osser
Albums conducted by Glenn Osser